Todd Merlin Compton (born 1952) is an American historian in the fields of Mormon history and classics. Compton is a respected authority on the plural wives of the LDS Church founder, Joseph Smith.

Biographical background 
Compton is a member of the Church of Jesus Christ of Latter-day Saints who lived for a number of years in Santa Monica, California. He has served an LDS mission to Ireland. He studied violin with Richard Nibley and has played electric violin with singer-songwriter Mark Davis. In 1982 he completed a master's degree from Brigham Young University. He later received a Ph.D. from UCLA in classics (concentrating on Greek and Indo-European mythology) which he taught for a year at USC. He also taught at UCLA and California State University, Northridge. He has been an independent researcher since 1993, drawing a regular income by working as an ADS specialist for a law office.

Compton began his serious work in Mormon history as a visiting fellow at the Huntington Library studying the journals of Eliza R. Snow. He found that his classics background helped his Mormon history work by teaching him respect for these primary documents. While researching, and trying to note people identified in Snow's journals, Compton found that he needed a good list of Joseph Smith's plural wives. Not finding one, he began researching his own list, which eventually grew into his 1997 book, In Sacred Loneliness: The Plural Wives of Joseph Smith.

Publications 
Compton's notable works include In Sacred Loneliness: The Plural Wives of Joseph Smith, which was awarded the Best Book Award from both the John Whitmer Historical Association and the Mormon History Association. The Mormon History Association also awarded him the 2002 Best Documentary Award for his and Charles Hatch's book A Widow's Tale: The 1884–1886 Diary of Helen Mar Kimball Whitney, and the 1996 Award of Excellence for his article "A Trajectory of Plurality: An Overview of Joseph Smith's Thirty Three Plural Wives".

Compton has contributed publications to the Foundation for Ancient Research and Mormon Studies (FARMS), including articles in FARMS Review of Books and Journal of Book of Mormon Studies and as an editor of the 1987 edition of Hugh Nibley's Mormonism and Early Christianity. He has also been published in The Encyclopedia of Mormonism, Women and Authority: Re-emerging Mormon Feminism, American Journal of Philology, Dialogue: A Journal of Mormon Thought, Sunstone Magazine, Classical Quarterly, and the Journal of Popular Culture.

From 1993–1998, Compton served on the editorial board for the periodical Dialogue: A Journal of Mormon Thought. Starting in 2004, Compton returned to work at Dialogue, this time as the editorial staff's History Editor. Compton has also served on the Board of Editors for the Journal of Mormon History since 2000.

Compton's biography of Jacob Hamblin, A Frontier Life: Jacob Hamblin, Explorer and Indian Missionary, was published by the University of Utah Press in September, 2013.  His article, "'In & through the roughefist country it has ever been my lot to travel'": Jacob Hamblin's 1858 Expedition Across the Colorado," (Utah Historical Quarterly, Winter 2012) received the Dale L. Morgan Award from the Utah State Historical Society.

In May 2017, through his company Pahreah Press, Compton published a book on the songwriting of the Beatles, titled Who Wrote the Beatle Songs? A History of Lennon-McCartney.

Works 

Books

Chapters

Articles and papers

References

External links 
  Todd Compton's Home Page
 
 Audio of interview by John Dehlin for Mormon Stories podcast: Part 1, Part 2 and Part 3

1952 births
20th-century Mormon missionaries
American classical scholars
21st-century American historians
21st-century American male writers
American Latter Day Saint writers
American Mormon missionaries in Ireland
Brigham Young University alumni
Historians of the Latter Day Saint movement
Living people
Mormon studies scholars
University of California, Los Angeles alumni
Latter Day Saints from Utah
Latter Day Saints from California
American expatriates in the Republic of Ireland
American male non-fiction writers